Terrence Edwin Roof Jr. (born December 11, 1963) is an American football coach and former player who is the defensive coordinator and linebackers coach at the University of Oklahoma. He previously served as a defensive analyst at Clemson University, where he worked with Oklahoma head coach Brent Venables. Prior to that, Roof was the defensive coordinator at Vanderbilt University.  Roof served as the head football coach at Duke University from 2003 to 2007, compiling a 6–45 record.

A former standout at linebacker for Georgia Tech, Roof was the defensive coordinator at Georgia Tech for two stints, from 1999 to 2001 under George O'Leary and 2013 to 2017 under Paul Johnson.Noted for his highly aggressive defenses,  Roof has also been the defensive coordinator at the University of Minnesota and at Auburn University, winning the 2011 BCS National Championship Game with the latter.

Early life and family
Roof attended Central Gwinnett High School and earned his bachelor's degree in management from Georgia Tech in 1987.  Roof is married to Pam Ash-Roof of Fayetteville, Georgia, and the couple have twin boys, Terrence Davis and Michael Edwin. Terrence is a linebacker at the University of Oklahoma, and Michael is a quarterback at Charlotte.

Playing career
After graduating from Central Gwinnett High School, Roof went on to play football for the Georgia Tech Yellow Jackets in 1982. He started his final three seasons and served as team captain while leading the Ramblin' Wreck's famed "Black Watch" defense as a senior. Their success fueled Georgia Tech's run to 9–2–1 in 1985, including a win over Michigan State in the All-American Bowl. Roof was honored as member of the All-America team, was selected to the All-ACC first team, and was named the Defensive Player of the Year by the Atlanta Touchdown Club. He remains among the most prolific tacklers in program history, ranking second for most tackles in a game with 25 against Tennessee in 1985 and seventh on the all-time tackling list with 417. Roof was enshrined into Georgia Tech's Athletics Hall of Fame in 1998.

Coaching career

Early career
Roof began his coaching career as a graduate assistant coach at the University of Alabama in 1987, where he helped on defense before taking his first full-time position as the linebackers coach at the University of West Georgia for the 1989 season.

After Steve Spurrier left Duke University in 1990, his successor, Barry Wilson, lured Roof to fill the position coaching outside linebackers on his staff. When Wilson and his staff were fired after the 1993 season, Roof left to serve as an assistant coach for the University of Massachusetts Amherst.

Western Carolina
Roof took his first job as defensive coordinator in 1997 at Western Carolina University, where he stayed one season before being lured away to join George O'Leary's staff at his alma mater.

Georgia Tech
After spending the first season coaching the Yellow Jackets linebackers, Roof was promoted to defensive coordinator. He was nominated for the 2000 Broyles Award, an annual honor given to the nation's top assistant coach, when his defense finished the season ranked 12th in the nation in rushing defense and 20th in scoring defense. The following season, the Yellow Jackets were again one of the top defenses in the nation, ranking 23rd nationally in total defense and 32nd against the run.

Duke
When O'Leary left for the University of Notre Dame, Roof left Georgia Tech to become the defensive coordinator at Duke for the 2002 season. Roof's instruction brought marked improvement to the Duke Blue Devils defense, which led the ACC in rushing defense after finishing ninth in the league the previous year. From 2001 to 2002, the Blue Devils moved from ninth to fifth in the ACC and from 113th to 58th nationally in total defense. They progressed in passing defense in the 2003 season, jumping to third-place in the ACC from ninth the previous year. When head coach Carl Franks was released midway through the 2003 season, Roof was promoted to interim head coach. The team finished the season by winning two of the last three games and Roof was subsequently hired as the 20th head coach at Duke on December 6, 2003. However, after winning only four games over the next four seasons, he was fired on November 26, 2007, having compiled a 6–45 record. Despite the dismal record of Duke teams under Roof, his aggressive defenses consistently ranked in the top-30 nationally in tackles behind the line of scrimmage.

Coach Roof's enthusiasm makes him successful. He has a passion for football. He lives, eats and sleeps football, and that rubs off on everyone around him (but no current playing field). Football is his first priority, but it goes deeper than that. He asks us our thoughts on the game plan, and then asks about our classes and families. It's a big thing when a coach cares about you and Coach Roof is so genuine. He really brought us together as a team.
--Kenneth Stanford, 2004 Duke co-captain

Minnesota
The 2008 pre-season saw Roof in strong demand. While he had initially been hired on January 6, 2008 by the University of Louisville to work alongside Ron English and Ken Delgado on the defense, it was reported on February 21, 2008 that Roof would succeed Everett Withers as the defensive coordinator at the University of Minnesota. Under just one season of Roof's tutelage, the Gophers made tremendous improvements to give up 160 fewer passing yards per game and over 135 fewer total yards when compared to the previous year's 119th ranked defense. Besides the nation's worst total defense, Roof also inherited a squad which had ranked 115th in pass defense, 114th in rushing defense and 109th in scoring defense in 2007. Roof's defense made strides throughout the season and finished ranked in the top-25 in both sacks and tackles for loss after being ranked 103rd and 116th the previous season. Roof's defense created 31 turnovers, second most in the Big Ten and 11th nationally. They were seventh in the nation causing fumbles (16), fueling the team's 16th ranking in turnover margin. Overall, the scoring defense improved to 61st, rushing defense to 69th, total defense to 79th and pass defense to 93rd. This quick turn-around on defense contributed to the Golden Gophers improving their record from 1–11 to 7–6 and garnering an appearance in the 2008 Insight Bowl.

Auburn
On January 6, 2009, Roof was hired as the defensive coordinator at Auburn University by first-year head coach Gene Chizik. Roof had just finished one season in a three-year contract at Minnesota reportedly worth $350,000 a year. His salary at Auburn was $370,000. While at Auburn, Roof coached in two bowl games, with wins in both the 2010 Outback Bowl and the 2011 BCS National Championship Game.

UCF
On December 8, 2011, Roof accepted the defensive coordinator position at the University of Central Florida. The move came after Roof led Auburn's defense to one of the worst statistical seasons in the program's history. Auburn's defense finished the 2011 regular season 78th in the nation, allowing 405.8 yards per game. The previous yards-per-game high for an Auburn defense was 389.1 in 1979.

Ted has played an important role in the success of our football program, helping Auburn win 29 games in three years, including a national championship last season. I'm very appreciative of the passion, energy and work ethic Ted brought to the program every day. I know that this will be a great opportunity for Ted to be reunited with his mentor in George O'Leary and we wish him and his family nothing but the best at UCF.--Gene Chizik, Auburn head coach, 2009-2012

Penn State
On January 10, 2012, Roof was hired by new head coach Bill O'Brien as defensive coordinator at Penn State. Due to the Jerry Sandusky child sex abuse scandal, on July 24, 2012 the National Collegiate Athletic Association (NCAA) sanctioned Penn State with a four-year postseason ban, loss of 40 scholarships over a four-year period and allowed players to transfer without having to sit out a year. Despite the difficult conditions of the program, Roof led the defense to rank second in the Big Ten Conference in scoring defense, led the league in sacks, ranked first in red-zone defense and third in turnover margin. Nationally, Penn State ranked tied for first in red-zone defense, 15th in sacks, 16th in scoring defense, 23rd in rushing defense, 28th in pass efficiency defense and 29th in total defense.

Georgia Tech (second stint)
On January 9, 2013, Georgia Tech announced Roof was returning to his alma mater as defensive coordinator for the Yellow Jackets.

NC State
On December 22, 2017, North Carolina State announced that Ted Roof was joining the Wolfpack staff as the 10th assistant coach allowed by a change in NCAA rules.

Appalachian State
In 2019, Roof joined Appalachian State University as their defensive coordinator.

Vanderbilt
In 2020, Roof was hired as the defensive coordinator at Vanderbilt University.

Clemson
In 2021, Roof joined Clemson University as a defensive analyst under defensive coordinator Brent Venables and head coach Dabo Swinney.

Oklahoma
On December 10, 2021, Roof was hired as the defensive coordinator and linebackers coach at the University of Oklahoma under head coach Brent Venables.

Head coaching record

*First 7 games coached by Carl Franks

References

External links

 Oklahoma profile

1963 births
Living people
American football linebackers
Alabama Crimson Tide football coaches
Appalachian State Mountaineers football coaches
Auburn Tigers football coaches
Duke Blue Devils football coaches
Georgia Tech Yellow Jackets football coaches
Georgia Tech Yellow Jackets football players
Minnesota Golden Gophers football coaches
NC State Wolfpack football coaches
Oklahoma Sooners football coaches
Penn State Nittany Lions football coaches
UCF Knights football coaches
UMass Minutemen football coaches
Vanderbilt Commodores football coaches
West Georgia Wolves football coaches
Western Carolina Catamounts football coaches
People from Lawrenceville, Georgia
Sportspeople from the Atlanta metropolitan area
Coaches of American football from Georgia (U.S. state)
Players of American football from Georgia (U.S. state)